Jullouville is a commune in the Manche department in north-western France.

Heraldry

See also
Communes of the Manche department
Groussey

References

Communes of Manche
Manche communes articles needing translation from French Wikipedia